Gottfried Becker (9 February 1767 – 21 June 1845) was a Danish pharmacist, professor and industrialist. He was the owner of Elefant Apotek on Købmagergade in Copenhagen.

Early life and education
Becker was born in Copenhagen, the son of Johan Gottfried Becker (1723–90) and his wife  Anna Christine Torm (1738–1809). After  completing secondary school and having been articled to his father's pharmacy for three years in 1786, he went to Germany where he spent one year with the prominent druggist Johann Christian Wiegleb in Langensalza. After his return to Denmark, he took the pharmaceutical exam and then went on another journey abroad, studying chemistry with Antoine Lavoisier in Paris as well as botany and mineralogy.

Career

After his father's death, he took over the Elephant Pharmacy (Elefantapoteket) on Købmagergade in Copenhagen. He was appointed court pharmacist in 1792 and became a lecturer in chemistry at the University of Copenhagen. In 1795, after journeys to Norway and the Netherlands, he was appointed professor chemiæ extraordinarius. From 1799 to 1844, he was assessor pharmaciæ.

He resigned as professor in 1806 due to hardness of hearing, a problem he had acquired in connection with a chemical experiment. In 1807, he established a dye factory. In 1809, he became field pharmacist. He was also a member of a wide range of commissions and learned societies and the writer of several works on natural sciences. He ceded the Elephant Pharmacy to his son in 1844. He was appointed Virkelig justitsråd in 1829 and Etatsråd in 1842.

Personal life
 
On 20 April 1794 in Amsterdam, he married Nicolette Adriane Burman (28 August 1774 in Amsterdam – 13 March 1824 in Copenhagen), a daughter of professor in botany Nicolaas Laurens Burman by his wife Anna Marie Verkolje (1753–1810). Their son, Johann Gottfried Burman Becker, was also a pharmacist as well as a writer on history.

Further reading
 Lauridsen, Finn H: Gottfried Becker : en københavnsk hofapoteker 1767-1845

References

External links
 Gottfried Becker at Geni Generology Directory

1767 births
1845 deaths
18th-century Danish scientists
19th-century Danish scientists
19th-century Danish businesspeople
Danish industrialists
Danish pharmacists
Scientists from Copenhagen